Syed Ibrahim bin Syed Noh is a Malaysian politician from PKR. He is the Member of Parliament for Ledang since 2018.

Politics 
He was the Chairman of Gerakan Mansuh ISA (GMI) and an activist for Ikram Malaysia (IKRAM) and the vice president of BERSIH 2.0. By December 10, 2014, he was chosen for the Head of Information of PKR.

In 2019, Anwar Ibrahim, the President of PKR had discussed with all branch leaders of PKR Johor to choose a new Chairman of the State Leadership Council of PKR Johor to replace Hassan Abdul Karim, the Member of Parliament of Pasir Gudang who had resigned. All branch leaders of PKR Johor supports the appointment of Syed Ibrahim as the new Chairman of the State Leadership Council of PKR Johor.

Election results

References

Living people
Place of birth missing (living people)
People's Justice Party (Malaysia) politicians
Members of the Parliament of Malaysia
1964 births
Malaysian people of Yemeni descent